The 1969 European Cup final was a football match held at the Santiago Bernabéu, Madrid, on 28 May 1969, that saw Milan of Italy play against Ajax of the Netherlands to determine who would be the champions of Europe that season. Ajax made history by becoming the first Dutch side to reach the final, but they were beaten by their Italian opponents 4–1.

As of 2022, Pierino Prati remains the most recent player to score a hat-trick in a European Cup or Champions League final.

Route to the final

Milan had a bye in the second round due to the withdrawal of a number of Eastern European clubs from the competition.

In the quarter-finals, eventual finalists Ajax were deadlocked 4–4 on aggregate against Portuguese side Benfica after two legs, forcing a replay. The Dutch champions won 3–0 in the replay, but it took extra time to do so.

Match

Details

See also
1968–69 European Cup
1995 UEFA Champions League final – contested by the same teams
A.C. Milan in European football
AFC Ajax in European football

References

External links
1968–69 season at UEFA.com
European Cups Archive at the Rec.Sport.Soccer Statistics Foundation
1968–69 season at European Cup History

1
European Cup Final 1969
European Cup Final 1969
UEFA Champions League finals
1969
Euro
Euro
May 1969 sports events in Europe
1960s in Madrid
Football in Madrid
Sports competitions in Madrid